This is a list of digital television deployments by country, which summarises the process and progress of transition from analogue to digital broadcasting.

The transition to digital television is a process that is happening at different paces around the world. Although digital satellite television is now commonplace, the switch to digital cable and terrestrial television has taken longer. See also Digital terrestrial television.

Not all countries are compatible within each standard DVB-T, ATSC (North America), DTMB (China), ISDB (of which there are two incompatible variations used in Japan and South America respectively). Countries that have adopted digital terrestrial recently may have a single MPEG4 based system for SD and HD, while countries with more established system may use MPEG2 for SD and MPEG4 for HD. There are also variations in middleware used. For example, Italy, Ireland and the UK are all DVB-T regions, but Ireland uses "MPEG4 + MHEG5 + DVB-T" for both SD and HD transmissions, while the UK uses "MPEG2 + MHEG5 + DVB-T" for SD and "MPEG4 + MHEG5 + DVB-T2" for HDTV, and Italy uses MHP rather than MHEG5 middleware. Since all MPEG4-capable receivers can decode the MPEG2 codec and all DVB-T2 tuners are capable of tuning DVB-T signals, UK HD set-top boxes are compatible with both the UK SD system and Irish SD/HD system, but Irish SD/HD tuners will only work with the SD system used in the UK. Digital cable broadcast tends to be DVB-C or very similar QAM in almost all countries. Broadband on cable is mostly DOCSIS which is DVB-C on the download path. This is important when buying a TV or set-box online rather than from a local retailer who would normally only stock the compatible system. Incompatible retail products are a severe problem in emerging retail digital markets where a neighbouring country has an older standard and dominates the retail trade, such as UK Freeview (rather than compatible "Freeview HD") products in Ireland.

Important DVB-T standards are UK D-book for UK Freeview and Nordig 2.2 for Scandinavia and Ireland. Ireland deviates from Nordig by using UK profile MHEG5 middleware rather than MHP.

Africa

Botswana 
ISDB-T International is adopted as the first country in Africa on February 26, 2013, evaluated the hierarchical mode of operation, which allows for the simultaneous transmission to fixed, mobile and portable receivers from a single transmitter, advantageous over DVB-T2. Broadcasting in digital drives to transform Botswana into an E-Society.

Mozambique
The earliest form of digital television in Mozambique began in 1996 with Southern African pay-TV operator DStv. Channels were transmitted and received via satellites and digital decoders. Some years later, TVCabo, began transmitting at first through analog and later digital means using decoders and an extensive fiber optic network. On January 18, Mozambique's Ministry of Transport and Communications announced that the country would be adopting the DVB-T2 system for transmission of terrestrial television channels. The implementation is expected to be completed by 2015.

Morocco
National Television Company in Morocco started DVB-T based digital TV deployment in February 2007.

Digital TV is now available in the following cities and their regions: Casablanca, Benslimane, Settat, Nouaceur, Mediouna, Mohammedia, Rabat, Salé, Skhirat-Temara, Kenitra, Sidi Kacem, Khemisset, Meknes, Fes, Oujda, Tanger and Marrakech.

Namibia
While Namibia's public broadcasters still rely on analogue transmission and have not announced a transition date to digital television, the pay-TV operator MultiChoice already operates a digital television service using the DVB-T standard.

South Africa
The first digital television implementation in South Africa was a satellite-based system launched by pay-TV operator MultiChoice in 1995. On 22 February 2007 the South African government announced that the country's public TV operators would be broadcasting in digital by 1 November 2008, followed by a three-year dual-illumination period which would end on 1 November 2011. The government in January 2011 announced a change in its choice of technology from DVB-T to DVB-T2 with the analog switch off date postponed to December 2013. The rollout of digital television has been further delayed until 2017, 2021.

Egypt
In 2020 to 2021, for the first time in Africa, HD demonstration content was received via satellite without the need for a separate external receiver or decoder. At the 2021 Industry Day's conference in Egypt, Cairo broadcast quality HD content (with a resolution of  pixels at 50FPS) was encoded using AVS encoder (at a bit rate of ).

Asia

Afghanistan
The Oqaab service using DVB-T2 was launched in 2015.

Cambodia
A digital television trial was completed on November 9, 2000 – May 31, 2001 and was officially launched on November 9, 2010, by TV5. Analog switch-off will be 2015–2020.

As of 2017, Phnom Penh Cable Television and One TV offer encrypted DVB-T2 pay TV services, viewable only with a subscription and set top box with card.

In Phnom Penh, the following channels are available free to air: S Movie, SREPLAY (ETV), S Cinema, Nice TV, Fox Sports, Fox Action Movies, ARY Musik, CGTN Documentary, YTN World, SanSha TV, OneTV Sabay 1.

China

In June and September 2003, the State Administration of Radio, Film, and Television (SARFT) selected 41 experimental spots for digital television trials and launched the trials later before year end 2003. Later, according to the Tenth Five Year Plan and 2010 long-range plan for radio, film and television, SARFT drafted a switch-off timetable for different levels of Chinese cities, towns and counties, in which it was commanded that by 2010 digital broadcasting be implemented overall and by 2015 analog televisions be phased out completely. It was estimated that by year end 2007, China would have over 27 million digital TV users.

In 2004, debates arose about whether the digital television technology by Tsinghua University or Shanghai Jiao Tong University should be adopted as the national standards. Finally, in late July 2007, China announced the final version of standards as a combined one and Tsinghua succeeded in this battle as 95% of its technology has been adopted.

On September 1, 2005, the first HDTV channel in China, which would be broadcast nationwide later, began to air in Hangzhou.

Hong Kong
On December 31, 2007, local broadcasters started to air HDTV (1920X1080i) using Chinese DTMB standard. Currently, there are 12 HD channels airing 24 hours daily. Hong Kong broadcasters are keen to use whichever standard China adopts, since doing so would allow them to transmit into the lucrative market in Southern China, and would lessen the need for costly format conversion.

India

In India there are over 600 Satellite television channels that are being broadcast as of 2012. India has adopted DVB-T system for digital television in July 1999. The first DVB-T transmission was started on 26 January 2003 in the four major metropolitan cities by Doordarshan. Currently the terrestrial transmission is available in both digital and analog formats. The Cable Digitalisation Act mandates all cable television networks to turnoff analogue transmission and switch to digital transmission by 31 March 2015. The digital transition is planned over four phases in the country. The first analogue transmission cutoff date is set to 1 November 2012, for the four major metropolitan cities (New Delhi, Mumbai, Kolkata and Chennai). The Second analogue transmission cutoff date is 31 March 2013 for Patna, Chandigarh, Pune and Bengaluru. The third analogue transmission cutoff date is 30 November 2014 for all urban areas including state capitals. The analogue transmission cut off date for all other cities in the country is set for 31 March 2015. The switchover was completed in December 2016.

Digital television is also available through Direct To Home service. These services are provided using locally built satellites from ISRO such as INSAT 4CR, INSAT 4A, INSAT-2E, INSAT-3C and INSAT-3E as well as private satellites such as the Dutch-based SES, Global-owned NSS 6, Thaicom-2 and Telstar 10. India currently has seven major DTH service providers and a total of over 23 million subscriber households in 2010. These are Dish TV (a ZEE TV subsidiary), Tata Sky, Sun Network owned 'Sundirect DTH', Reliance owned BIG TV, Bharti Airtel's DTH Service 'Airtel Digital TV' and the public sector DD Direct Plus. As of 2010, India has the most competitive Direct-broadcast satellite market with seven operators vying for more than 110 million TV homes. India overtook USA as the world's largest Direct-broadcast satellite market in 2012.

Indonesia
Indonesia began experimenting with digital TV broadcasting in 2008. In January 2014, the Supreme Court annulled the decisions of the Communication and Information Technology Regulation, removing requirements for an analog shut-off and allowing local analogue broadcasters to rent back channels allocated to digital broadcasting. From August 2014, UHF DVB-T2 equipment has been available for public purchase.

Iran
Iran started the transition to digital TV broadcasting in 2009 using DVB-T MPEG-4 standard. Iran plans to completely switch over to digital TV by 2015. As of summer of 2011, Iranian digital TV broadcast covered 40% of Iran's population.

Israel
The Knesset approved the law regarding DTT in late 2007. The Second Authority for Television and Radio is responsible for the deployment of the system - the project name is "Idan+". The package consists of 6 channels: IBA1, IBA33, Channel 2, Channel 10, Channel 23 (Israeli Educational Television) and The Knesset Channel. DVB-T broadcasts using the MPEG-4 Part 10, H.264 (AVC) video and HE AAC+ V2 audio codecs were launched in mid-2009. There were proceedings in the Knesset to add local music channel 24 to the system as well. Full technical details along with a map of the country showing transmitter locations can be found here  and here .

Additional channels will be added using the DVB-T2 standard already testing since 2014 in central Israel, showing mainly IBA-TV1 HD channel and various tests in Dolby Digital.

Japan
Japan pioneered HDTV with an analog implementation. The old system is not compatible with the new digital standards. Japanese terrestrial broadcasting of HD via ISDB-T started on December 1, 2003, in the Tokyo, Osaka, and Nagoya metropolitan areas of Japan, and expanded to the outer areas before September 30, 2007. It has been reported that 31 million HD receivers have been sold in Japan as of January 2008.

The Japanese government is studying the implementation of some improvements on the standard as suggested by Brazilian researchers (SBTVD). These new features are unlikely to be adopted in Japan due to incompatibility problems, but are being considered for use in future implementations in other countries, including Brazil itself.

The move to DTV by consumers is relatively slow, partly because high-definition televisions are very expensive. Additionally, there have been issues with the B-CAS system and Digital Rights Management in respect to the home recording of broadcasts.

On December 20, 2007, the Japanese electronics industry association set the rule (of copy control) for DTT broadcasting that allows consumers up 10 times more dubbing of entire TV program with video and audio into DVD recorder, etc. by way of a new program called . Dubbing 10 was planned to start on June 2, 2008, but it was postponed A settlement with the Japanese Society for Rights of Authors, Composers and Publishers was reached on June 15, and it was later confirmed on June 24 that the Dubbing 10 program will start on July 4, 2008. The manufacturers for the DVD and associated DTT recorders will make the units conform to the "Dubbing 10" rule and some manufacturers might release the downloading subprograms to update the recorder's internal software for existing users.

On April 3, 2008, DPA (The Association for Promotion of Digital Broadcasting-Japan) announced that there has been a total 32.71 million of DTT (ISDB-T) receiving television sets (except 1seg receivers) installed in Japan as of end of March 2008. DPA also announced the guideline documentation to manufacturers who make the DTT receiver, recorder and replay units to operate with the personal computer on April 8, 2008. This add-on unit operates on USB or PCI BUS, and went on sale in May 2008.

From January 22 to January 24, 2010, analog television broadcasting was suspended for 48 hours as part of a rehearsal to approximately 7,000 homes in Suzu and parts of Noto.

On September 24, 2010, at noon, analog TV transmissions officially ended in Suzu and parts of Noto (approximately 8,800 homes) as part of the rehearsal plan that took place one year ahead of the nationwide shutdown, which was scheduled to start on July 24, 2011. Though this analog broadcasting shutdown was isolated to a small, rural area, it was the first complete analog shutdown in Asia outside of Israel.

On April 20, 2011, the Ministry of Internal Affairs and Communications confirmed that the analog terrestrial TV service will shut down on July 24 in 44 of the 47 prefectures. The three prefectures of Iwate, Miyagi and Fukushima were heavily damaged by the 9.0 magnitude earthquake and its related nuclear accidents, and as a result, television stations in those three prefectures shut down their analog signals nine months later on March 31, 2012.

South Korea (Republic of Korea)
After a long controversy between the government and broadcasters in South Korea, ATSC was chosen over DVB-T. Since 2005, digital services have been available across the entire country. South Korea also developed its own mobile TV standard called DMB, Digital Multimedia Broadcasting, based on the European technology af Digital Audio Broadcasting (DAB). It has a satellite, subscription-based, version (S-DMB), and a free, terrestrial version (T-DMB). T-DMB encountered a wide success, both in South Korea and abroad. For more details see Digital Multimedia Broadcasting.

Malaysia

Malaysia started DVB-T tests in 2006, and the first DTTB services were rolled out in a few areas of the country in January 2014. On 6 June 2017, digital television officially launched in the country with the launch of MYTV Broadcasting. Nine channels are being broadcast on the service, including: TV1, TV2, TV3, NTV7, 8TV, TV9, TVi, TV Alhijrah, and BNC News. Analogue broadcast is scheduled to be phasing out in stages by 3rd quarter of 2019. Langkawi become the first area of analogue television switch off that were executed on 21 July at 02:30 AM (UTC+8). Further on 6 August, the Malaysian Communications and Multimedia Ministry released a complete list of transition date on the remaining areas with central and southern West Malaysia to be commenced on 19 August, northern West Malaysia on 2 September, eastern coast West Malaysia on 17 September and entire East Malaysia on 30 September. The switch over in West Malaysia are fully completed on 16 October at 12:30 AM (UTC+8), while the final switch over in East Malaysia are completed on 31 October also at 12:30 AM (UTC+8) as scheduled.

Satellite
 Astro (DVB-S over Ku-Band)
 Astro B.yond (DVB-S over Ku-Band and DVB-S2 over Ka-Band)
 Astro NJOI (DVB-S over Ku-Band and DVB-S2 over Ka-Band)

Cable
 ABN Xcess (DVB-C, coaxial cable)

IPTV
 Unifi TV (DVB-IPTV, Fiber, VLAN 600)
 Astro IPTV (DVB-IPTV, Fiber, VLAN 612)
 DETV (DVB-IPTV, open Internet)

Pakistan

Digital television has been launched in Pakistan with Chinese assistance as part of the China–Pakistan Economic Corridor

On April 20, 2015, Prime Minister Nawaz Sharif and Chinese President Xi Jinping implemented a number of agreements between the two very friendly countries which included Pakistani adoption of the Digital Terrestrial Multimedia Broadcast Chinese standard. The Pakistani side had previously evaluated the other competing digital standards including the European DVB-T and Japanese ISDB-T before rejecting them infavour of the Chinese technology which extremely impressed the Pakistani government. ZTE. a Chinese telecommunications giant. was selected by the Chinese government to roll out digital television services in Pakistan. this will also include staff training and content creation including partnerships with Chinese multinational companies in multiple areas including television sets and set top boxes as a form of "International Cooperation".

The Chinese presence in Pakistan's digital landscape has been increasing in recent years and the DTMB adoption by Pakistan and the increasing Chinese information and telecommunications technology in Pakistan is part of the wider Belt and Road Initiative with the goal to great a "Digital Silk Road" in Pakistan to Africa and Europe.

Philippines

Digital television transition in the Philippines started its planning stage in 2006 after the National Telecommunications Commission released a memorandum on what DTV broadcast standard was to be adopted for the country. The commission decided to have UHF TV channels 14–51 at frequency spectrum 470-698 MHz given over to digital broadcast. The commission opted not to choose the ATSC standard, although the Philippines uses the NTSC-M standard. Instead the country started test trials of two different standards, those being the DVB of Europe and ISDB of Japan. Many broadcasters agreed to adopt the Japanese ISDB but some opted for the European DVB. On June 11, 2010, the National Telecommunications Commission of the Philippines announced that the country would adopt the ISDB standard. The first fully operational digital TV channel in the country is GEM-TV49 of the religious group Iglesia ni Cristo.

While the Japanese ISDB-T standard was adopted for terrestrial digital TV transmission, digital cable and satellite TV providers in the Philippines such as SkyCable and Cignal use the European DVB system for service distribution to carry some channels based in Europe, Taiwan, Malaysia, and Singapore (which are using DVB) through country-specific feed of them.

An internet user had created an  online petition urging NTC to adopt ATSC or ATSC 3.0 together with or replace the currently existing ISDB-T.

Saudi Arabia
The first phase of digital terrestrial television (DTT) transmission in Saudi Arabia was launched on the 11 June 2006 in the main cities of Riyadh, Jeddah and Dammam, the ArabNews reports. Assistant Deputy Minister of Culture and Information for Engineering Affairs, Riyadh Najm, said: "The southern city of Abha and the central city of Buraidah will also have the facility within this month." He added, "By February next year (20??) the DTT system will cover not less than 23 cities and that accounts for more than 70 percent of the population". He also said the DTT technology would allow people to receive all the four Saudi channels (Channel One, Channel Two, Arriyadiah and Al Ekhbariya) as well as the Saudi radio programmes (General Programme, Radio Qur’an, Second Programme and European Programme) with better clarity.

Kuwait
DVB-T2 modern technology for broadcasting TV channels within the borders of the state of Kuwait and broadcasts are received through receivers (receivers) that are connected to television sets if the devices are not supported by this technology.
the channels covered by digital terrestrial TV broadcasting?
Kuwait State TV package as follows:
- The first
- The second
- Sports
- Sports Plus
- Enrichment
- Arabi
- the Council
- Spouse
- Stay home
Most countries of the world have the technology of digital terrestrial television broadcasting. https://www.media.gov.kw/DVBT2.aspx

Singapore
Singapore's digital TV (DTV) journey started in 2012 when it was announced that the nation's free-to-air TV channels will go fully digital using the DVB-T2 (Digital Video Broadcasting – Second Generation Terrestrial) broadcasting standard. Since December 2013, all seven Mediacorp channels have been broadcast in digital.

On 6 November 2017, MDA announced that analogue television would cease to broadcast entirely by the end of 2018, up from the intended 19 February 2018, to facilitate more time for majority of Singaporeans to switch to DTV as soon as possible. The analogue broadcast was finally ceased on 2 January 2019.

The adoption of the DVB-T2 standard was decided after a successful trial that was conducted with free-to-air broadcaster Mediacorp. The trial, which involved some 500 households in Ang Mo Kio and Bedok estates, showed that DVB-T2 was suitable for deployment in Singapore's urbanised environment. DVB-T2 also offers higher efficiency, robustness and flexibility, enabling efficient use of valuable terrestrial spectrum for the delivery of audio, video and data services to fixed, portable and mobile devices.

Sri Lanka
The first Television network of Sri Lanka was launched on 13 April 1979. The ITN channel, owned by the Independent Television Network Limited (ITN) became the first terrestrial television channel of Sri Lanka. On June 5, 1979, ITN was converted to a government-owned business and was later brought under the Sri Lanka Rupavahini Act of 1982 along with the newly created Sri Lanka Rupavahini Corporation (SLRC).
Significant changes occurred in 1992 as the government permitted the establishment of private television networks. Subsequently, the MTV Channel network was launched in collaboration with Singapore Telecommunications Limited (Singtel).
Since then many new television networks have come into existence within Sri Lanka. There are also a number of Satellite networks and pay per view television networks in Sri Lanka. The national telecommunications provider, Sri Lanka Telecom also launched an IPTV service in 2008. MTV Channel had introduced Sri Lanka's first 24-hour Television channel,"Sirasa TV" on the 2009 as a thought to satisfy the thoughts of the public to analyse the ongoing global affairs.

Taiwan
Digital television launched terrestrially in Taiwan on July 2, 2004. Currently, there are simulcasts of analogue and digital television. Taiwan plans to replace an American analogue broadcasting system NTSC with a European digital TV system DVB-T2 by 2012 using 6 MHz channel bandwidth just like in Colombia, Panama, and Trinidad and Tobago. To assist lower-income families with the switch to digital television, the government plans to provide NT$300 million in aid to purchase converters or for the purchase of new digital televisions.

Thailand

The first digital television service in Thailand was launched by satellite based pay-TV operator IBC in 1996 using the DVB-S system.

Starting from December 2000, the Thai national broadcaster Modernine TV began its trial Digital Terrestrial Digital Television (DDTV) service for six months to 2000 selected households in the capital city of Bangkok and surrounding areas on UHF Band 658 MHz and 674 MHz (or Channel 44 and 46) using the DVB-T standard. The trial DDTV service will of current "current" 2 analogue TV channels (i.e. Modernine TV and TV3) in digital, and 2 new digital-only channels, namely MCOT 1 and ASEAN TV. Also provided under the service are seven FM radio stations in digital audio and interactive services. Nationwide implementation is planned to begin by the year 2007 or 2008, although as of August 2008 digital transmission is still only available in the Bangkok Metropolitan Area and possibly deferred. Even though MCOT's trial was a success, the future of the digital terrestrial television transition has become uncertain, especially after the end of Somchai Wongsawat's tenure as the prime minister and the beginning of successor Abhisit Vejjajiva. All the above digital television services are in standard definition and MCOT would have initiated HDTV trials by 2009.

Vietnam

Vietnam tested DVB-T in 2003 from a national school in Ho Chi Minh City. A DVB-T channel is launching in 2001 by VTC Digital. DVBT2 was launched in 2011 in Vietnam by AVG - Audio Video Global JSC, now is MobiTV by Mobifone - Vietnam Mobile Telecom Services (from 26/2/2016). Analogue signals switched off on 01/11/2015 in Da Nang, Vietnam. Da Nang is the first city in Asean has launched analogue switch off successfully.

Oceania

Australia

Digital Satellite
There are many digital satellite TV services in Australia, these are, Foxtel, Austar, Selectv, Optus, TransACT and UBI World TV.  Digital satellite television is popular with Foxtel and Austar alone reaching over one quarter of the nation's population.

Digital Free-to-air

Digital terrestrial television in Australia commenced on 1 January 2001, in the country's five most populous cities, Sydney, Melbourne, Brisbane, Adelaide and Perth. Digital services using DVB-T standards are available nationwide. Analogue transmissions were phased out between mid-2010 and December 2013.

Digital Cable 
Digital Cable operators in Australia are Foxtel, Neighbourhood Cable in some regional cities in Victoria, and Austar in Darwin.  These services are available to the following cities: Sydney, Melbourne, Brisbane, Adelaide, Perth, Gold Coast, Canberra, Hobart, Geelong, Ballarat, Bendigo, Albury/Wodonga, Mildura and Darwin.

Cook Islands

Digital Free to Air
On the Island of Aitutaki - ArauraTV & Radio Ltd have commenced broadcasting in the DVB-T2 format - leapfrogging the technology being used by most terrestrial broadcasters elsewhere in the Pacific. They are currently broadcasting 6 channels of content and this will increase to 8 channels before the end of 2021.

New Zealand
In New Zealand, there are several forms of broadcast digital television. Sky's Pay TV satellite service (available nationwide), Freeview's free-to-air satellite service (available nationwide), Freeview's free-to-air terrestrial service and multiple IPTV service providers.

Satellite
Sky TV launched New Zealand's first nationwide digital Pay TV service in December 1998 and had a monopoly on digital satellite TV until the launch of Freeview's nationwide digital Satellite service in May 2007.

Terrestrial
The Freeview terrestrial service is a high definition digital terrestrial television service using AVCHD, launched on April 14, 2008. The service currently serves 86 percent of the population - notable large towns without the service include Whakatane, Blenheim, Oamaru and Queenstown.

Europe

Albania
Analogue terrestrial television in Albania is supposed to switch off in September 2019.

Albania has three major forms of broadcast digital television. Terrestrial (DVB-T2) using MPEG4, Cable (DVB-C) using MPEG4 and MPEG2, and Satellite (DVB-S). In addition multiple IPTV services are available.

Belgium

Belgium now has three major forms of broadcast digital television: Terrestrial (DVB-T/DVB-H), Cable (DVB-C), and Satellite (DVB-S). In addition, IPTV services are available.

In Belgium, all the regions have completed the analog switchover (DVB-T).

Bulgaria

Croatia
Analogue terrestrial television was switched off in Croatia on 5 October 2010.

Croatian Radiotelevision (HRT) started to transmit DVB-S programmes in 1997. It transmits all four state-owned TV channels (HRT 1, HRT 2, HRT 3 and HRT 4), and three radio stations (HR 1, HR 2 and HR 3).

Croatia started to test DVB-T transmission early in 2002. It transmitted 4 national TV channels (HRT 1, HRT 2, HRT 3 and Nova TV) on a network of 9 transmitters built by Odašiljači i veze, completed in 2007 and covering about 70% of the country. Entire Croatia is covered with DVB-T in from 5 October 2010. The analogue switch-off process took place region by region, starting from January 2010 in Istria and Rijeka region and completing the switch-off on 5 October 2010 when the final region (Zagreb) was converted fully to DVB-T.

MPEG-2/SDTV is selected as a platform for free-to-air channels, initially with two MUX channels covering, where MUX A would be used by public TV Croatian Radiotelevision (HRT) and MUX B used by commercial TV stations, while later MUX C and MUX D will be populated by HD and regional channels, respectively.

Croatia has started transition in 2019 to DVB-T2 HVEC for national broadcast.

Czech Republic 
Analogue terrestrial television was switched off on 30 November 2011.

Czech Republic launched first experimental DVB-T broadcast in May 2000, which was then made available to the public in October 2005. There are currently 4 primary multiplexes and 8 regional multiplexes (RS1-RS8).

As of November 2019, Czech Republic started the transition to the DVB-T2 standard. This transition will be finished on 24 June 2020, when DVB-T broadcast will be terminated nationwide.

Finland
Analogue terrestrial television was switched off in Finland on 1 September 2007, and analogue cable television on 1 March 2008. All pay-TV channels switched to DVB-T2 in May 2017. Finland switches fully to DVB-T2 on March 31, 2020

Ireland

In Ireland, there are a number of providers of digital television. These include Sky Ireland which is operated by Sky plc (available nationwide), while Virgin Media Ireland, Magnet Networks and Cablecomm provide various digital-cable services. Digital Television is also available by IPTV provider Magnet Networks.

In 2008 Boxer TV were awarded the position to operate Ireland's Digital Terrestrial Television platform which was meant to be rolled with RTÉ NL over the next 5 years. This service was to offer subscription services and free-to-air channels sometime in late 2009 using MPEG4 standard. On 9 May 2009 it was reported OneVision were then likely to operate the pay DTT service. The official announcement was made later that month. Due to an economic downturn in the Irish economy, Boxer TV, which operated in Sweden and Denmark claimed it was unfeasible for the company to operate in Ireland. On 11 May 2009 it was reported Onevision would operate the pay DTT service. Further setbacks were announced on 9 July 2009 when it was confirmed by Ireland's national broadcaster that RTÉ would not launch its DTT service until other media partners were ready to launch their services. The original launch date was September 2009 and finally took place in October 2010.

Italy

Latvia
Latvia now has three major forms of broadcast digital television. Terrestrial (DVB-T) using MPEG4 and MPEG2, Cable (DVB-C) using MPEG4 and MPEG2, and Satellite (DVB-S). In addition multiple IPTV services are available.

Lithuania
Lithuania now has three major forms of broadcast digital television. Terrestrial (DVB-T) using MPEG-4, Cable (DVB-C), and Satellite (DVB-S). In addition IPTV services are available.

Netherlands

The Netherlands now has three major forms of broadcast digital television. Terrestrial (DVB-T2), Cable (DVB-C), and Satellite (DVB-S2). In addition IPTV services are available. In the past Analogue TV was broadcast in PAL terrestrial and cable. Terrestrial broadcasting switched to the Digital standard (DVB-T) in 2007 and to (DVB-T2) in 2019. Cable started broadcasting digital in 2001. Most cable companies switched off Analogue in 2021. Satellite broadcasting switched to the Digital standard (DVB-S) in 1996 and to (DVB-S2) around 2010. The last (DVB-S) channels were shutdown in 2016.

DVB-H was only available for a brief period between 2008 and 2011 in the bigger cities. Lack of interest led to the shutdown of DVB-H.

Norway
The shutdown of the analogue service in Norway started on March 4, 2008, and was finished on December 1, 2009. (MPEG-4)

Poland

Analogue broadcast switch-off started on 7 November 2012 and was completed by 31 July 2013.

Portugal

Portugal started its first digital broadcast with TVCabo Satélite (nowadays known as "NOS TV Satélite") in 1998, later, in 2001, implementation of Interactive services brought digital TV to the wired cable networks. While the Satellite branch was (and still is) popular in areas where the Cable branch is not available (such as remote areas and villages), iTV never became successful, and was later discontinued in 2002. Digital broadcast was still available under the name "powerbox" (after the STB used to receive the signal). In 2005, a little "analog switchover" happened, where coded analog channels (known as Premium) would cease broadcast in favour of powerbox. Every pay-TV provider offers digital television. As of 2010, all Premium channels in all pay-TV providers, are digital. DTT started on November 1, 2008, for Lisbon and Castelo Branco, and on April 26, 2009, for 80% of the country, and the government plans to cover the rest of the country until 2010-2011 New Year's Eve. Analog will then be switched off 6 months after TDT covers 87% of the country via terrestrial transmitters and 13% via satellite complementary coverage.

Romania
https://web.archive.org/web/20161127022323/http://www.tvdigitala.ro/acoperire/
http://www.dvbt.ro/
http://www.radiocom.ro/poze/dvb-t2/Tranzitie%20DVB-T2_Octombrie_2016.pdf

Russia 

Russia uses DVB-T2 standard for digital broadcasting. The transition to digital terrestrial TV broadcasting was initiated in Russia in 2009 and took almost 10 years. Russian digital broadcasting consists of two "multiplexes" with 10 channels each which are generally available everywhere in the country. There is also a third "multiplex" which was originally supposed to be regional-oriented but it is deployed only in some regions, e.g., Moscow.

Serbia 
The transition to DVB-T2 digital television in Serbia started on September 1, 2014, and was finished on June 1, 2015. Analogue terrestrial television was finally switched off on June 7, 2015. As of that day, nearly 97.8% of country's population is covered by digital signal.

Slovenia 

Slovenia completed its switch to DVB-T (MPEG-4) on the 1st December 2010 with the termination of all analogue transmissions on a single day. There are two multiplexes carried nationwide as well as several local multiplexes.

Spain 
The development of digital terrestrial television was very similar to the failure of ITV Digital in the United Kingdom. In 1999, digital terrestrial television was introduced in the country by the pay per view platform Quiero Television. In May 2002, statewide operators were required to start broadcasting in DVB-T. Yet, Quiero TV ceased transmissions in 2002 after a commercial failure. Unlike the UK, the three and half multiplexes left by the platform were not reassigned to other operators, and so 5 channels were squashed into a single multiplex.

On 30 November 2005, digital terrestrial television was relaunched as a free service with 20 channels and 14 radio stations, along with 23 regional- and local-language channels in their respective areas. Each multiplex has a minimum of 4 SD channels each or one HD channel. By 2010, coverage reached over 98% of the population, and the analog signal was switched off on 2 April 2010.

Sweden

The shutdown of the analogue service in Sweden started on September 19, 2005, and was finished on October 29, 2007.

United Kingdom
The United Kingdom now has five major forms of broadcast digital television, direct-to-home satellite services provided by British Sky Broadcasting (branded as Sky) and Freesat, digital cable television services provided by Virgin Media and WightFibre, and a free-to-air digital terrestrial service called Freeview. In addition there are two IPTV systems known as TalkTalk TV owned by The Carphone Warehouse, and BT Vision, which is provided by BT. Individual access methods vary throughout the country.

Terrestrial

The initial attempt at launching a digital terrestrial broadcasting service on November 15, 1998, ONdigital (later called ITV Digital), was unsuccessful and the company went into liquidation.

ITV Digital was replaced in late 2002 by Freeview, which uses the same DVB-T technology, but with higher levels of error correction and more robust (but lower-capacity) modulation on the "Public Service" multiplexes in an attempt to counter the reception problems which dogged its predecessor. Rather than concentrating on Pay TV services, Freeview uses the available capacity to provide a free-to-air service that includes all the existing five free-to-air analogue terrestrial channels and about twenty new digital channels. All services are transmitted in SDTV mode.

March 31, 2004 saw the return of a limited pay-television offering to the digital terrestrial platform with the launch of Top Up TV. This new service is designed to appeal to those who do not want to pay the high subscription fees that Sky Television and the Cable networks demand. The service carries a restricted hours service of some of the UK's most watched channels including the Discovery Channel, Gold, Discovery Real Time, British Eurosport and Cartoon Network, sharing just three different slots. In October 2006, Top Up TV renamed itself Top Up TV Anytime, taking advantage of the increase in the popularity of digital video recorders, and its limited channel space. Now over 100 programs (not channels) are broadcast overnight and added to the box's hard drive, and may be watched at any time. Channels that provide content for the overnight service include MTV, Nickelodeon and Hallmark Channel.

2005 saw the first areas of the United Kingdom losing their analogue signal in a pilot test. The residents of Ferryside and Llansteffan in Carmarthenshire, Wales who had not already upgraded to digital television were given a free set-top box to receive the Freeview television service, which includes Channel 4 (previously unavailable terrestrially from transmitters in Wales) and S4C2, which broadcasts sessions of the National Assembly for Wales. Digital transmissions for this pilot commenced in December 2004, at which time a message was added to the analogue picture advising viewers that the analogue services would end in February 2005.

2005 also saw the announcement by the regulator Ofcom about the proposed analogue switch off plans for the UK. The switch off progressed on an ITV region by region basis that began in 2008 with the Border region, and ended in the UTV region in 2012. The coverage of the three public service broadcasting multiplexes is the same as that enjoyed by the former analogue TV stations (98.5% of the population), while the three commercial multiplexes cover 90% of the population.

Freeview HD

The BBC, ITV, Channel 4 and Channel 5 ran terrestrial HDTV trials involving 450 homes in the London area during June–December 2006 on locally unused frequencies. As part of this trial, the BBC broadcast BBC HD, which was free to air but could not be received by any set-top boxes commercially available at the time. It could however be received and played back by any PC equipped with a DVB-T card using a software H.264 decoder.

With two channels (BBC HD and ITV HD), Freeview HD completed a "technical launch" on 2 December 2009 from the Crystal Palace and Winter Hill transmitters. This time, in addition to H.264 being used as the codec, the broadcast utilised DVB-T2 rather than the DVB-T used by standard Freeview and the earlier test broadcasts, thus requiring users to purchase new reception equipment. Freeview HD was the first operational TV service in the world to use the DVB-T2 standard.

Freeview HD set-top boxes and televisions were made available at the consumer launch of the service in early 2010. In order to qualify for the Freeview HD logo, receivers need to be IPTV-capable and display Freeview branding, including the logo, on the electronic programme guide screen.

On 25 March 2010 Channel 4 HD was added to Freeview HD on channel 52 with a placeholding caption; it launched on 30 March 2010, coinciding with the commercial launch of Freeview HD. S4C Clirlun launched in April 2010 in Wales, where Channel 4 HD is not available. BBC One HD was also added to the service on 3 November 2010.

Cable
Virgin Media (formerly known as NTL:Telewest, after a merger of NTL Incorporated with Telewest Global, Inc.), became in 2006 the first "quadruple-play" media company in the United Kingdom, bringing together a service consisting of television, broadband internet, mobile phone and fixed-line telephone services. Virgin Media ranks as the UK's second largest pay TV service, having 3.6m subscribers and 55% national availability.

Trials of the UK's first HDTV service, the TVDrive PVR from Telewest, began on 1 December 2005 on a commercial pilot basis before a full launch in March 2006. Due to the merger between NTL and Telewest, the TVDrive was made available to NTL cable customers in the Teesside and Glasgow areas on 16 November 2006. In January 2007, NTL:Telewest began renting the STB nationwide and since the acquisition of the Virgin Media name, it is now officially available in all areas with the new V+ branding. Virgin Media is also the only cable provider to supply video on demand services.

As of October 2009, Virgin Media are broadcasting seven HD channels with plans for further new HD channels during 2010.

WightFibre also provide cable television to the residents of the Isle of Wight.

Satellite
On 1 November 2005 ITV turned off encryption on all of its satellite-based signals, following the lead from the BBC. These transmissions are on a limited spotbeam which is aimed primarily towards the United Kingdom, via the Astra 2D satellite located at 28.2 degrees east. This theoretically limits reception to Iceland, Ireland and the United Kingdom, allowing ITV to fulfil licensing agreements with content producers. However, many people report successful reception of these signals from across Europe by using larger dishes.

Sky+ HD is offered by BSkyB in both Ireland and the United Kingdom as an add-on to their existing Sky subscription service. The BBC is broadcasting BBC HD as a free-to-air channel from the Astra 2D satellite, and the channel can be viewed for free with suitable satellite reception equipment. There are additional equipment and subscription charges for HD from Sky TV but they are broadcasting over 30 channels in the HD format. Sky also offers a free-to-air version of its regular Sky service known as Freesat from Sky. Freesat from Sky provides a non-subscription card for public service broadcast channels Channel 4 and Channel 5, however Film4, Film4+1 are free-to-air.

On 12 July 2006, the BBC and ITV announced a free-to-air satellite service as a competitor to Freesat from Sky, to be called Freesat. The service was officially launched on 6 May 2008 and covers all BBC and ITV digital TV channels, plus interactive services, radio channels, and other channels. It is being touted as the satellite equivalent to Freeview, especially for areas unable to receive the Freeview DTT service.

North America

Canada

The Canadian Radio-television and Telecommunications Commission (CRTC) has adopted the same digital television standard for stations in Canada as the United States and Mexico. The CRTC initially decided not to enforce a single date for transitioning to digital broadcasts, opting to let the economy decide when the switchover will occur. However, a later decision settled on the date of August 31, 2011, limited to 30 markets.  In addition, by August 31, 2011, all full power transmitters on channels 52 and above must either relocate to a lower channel or shut down.

CITY-TV was the first Canadian station to provide digital terrestrial service. As of 2007, other digital stations on-air include the CBC and Radio-Canada stations in Toronto and Montreal, as well as CTV's CFTO and CIVT, and CKXT (SUN TV). This list is not necessarily exhaustive and other station launches are completed or pending, although most are in the largest markets of Toronto, Vancouver and Montreal. Also, this does not include digital or high definition versions of specialty channels.

On November 22, 2003, CBC had their first broadcast in HD, in the form of the Heritage Classic outdoor NHL game between the Edmonton Oilers and the Montreal Canadiens. Bell Satellite TV, a Canadian satellite company, Rogers Cable and Vidéotron provide somewhat more than 21 HDTV channels to their subscribers including TSN HD, Rogers Sportsnet HD, Discovery HD (Canadian Edition), The Movie Network HD, and several U.S. stations plus some PBS feeds and a couple of pay-TV movie channels. CTV Toronto broadcast in HD along with its western counterpart, BC CTV. They were also the first to broadcast a terrestrial HD digital ATSC signal in Canada. Global joined the crowd in late 2004. Other networks are continuing to announce availability of HD signals. CHUM Limited's Citytv in Toronto was the first HDTV broadcaster in Canada; however, now most cable and satellite subscribers across Canada can access multiple channels in HDTV with major American and Canadian affiliate stations broadcasting HDTV signals with no CANCON overlay for advertising. Typically these channels are NBC HD, ABC HD, CBS HD, Fox HD, TSN HD, Sportsnet HD, CBC HD, etc., as of summer 2006. CBC HD officially launched their HDTV programming on March 5, 2005. CBC HD broadcasts the first game of their Hockey Night in Canada Saturday double header in HDTV. The 2006 Stanley Cup playoffs games have seen an increased amount of HDTV coverage as well.

Mexico
Mexican television broadcaster Televisa made experimental HDTV broadcasts in the early-1990s, in collaboration with Japan's NHK, but the country moved to implement the ATSC standard like the rest of the North American continent. Today, the vast majority of events and programs are broadcast in high definition. Currently almost all the cable providers as well as SKY the major DTH provider offer HD channels.

By the third quarter of 2005, HDTV transmissions from TV Azteca were available in Mexico's largest markets: Mexico City, Guadalajara and Monterrey. Phase Two of TV Azteca's national roll-out brought HDTV services to six cities along the Mexico-U.S. border (Matamoros, Reynosa, Nuevo Laredo, Ciudad Juárez, Mexicali, and Tijuana) by the first half of 2006. This roll-out took advantage of HDTV receivers already in place thanks to an earlier HDTV roll-out by stations on the American side of the border. TV Azteca has also broadcast the Mexican football tournament in HDTV.

XETV in Tijuana, Baja California, is on the air in HDTV using 720p format. This affiliate of the American CW Network is on UHF channel 23 broadcasting from Mt. San Antonio in Tijuana, with 403,000 watts, directed primarily northward at San Diego. In January 2006, Televisa's XEFB-TV and Multimedios' XHAW-TV in Monterrey began HDTV transmissions on UHF channels 48 and 50, respectively. In February 2006, Televisa's XHUAA in Tijuana began its HDTV transmissions on channel 20. Unfortunately they have no HDTV programs. Channel 20 broadcasts an upconverted version of the programs of XHUAA's analog signal on channel 57.

Official plan for Mexican DTT
Currently there are 38 digital channels in Mexico. They are:
11 in Mexico City
6 in Monterrey
5 in Guadalajara
5 in Tijuana
5 in Juarez
3 in Mexicali
2 in Reynosa
2 in Matamoros
3 in Nuevo Laredo

The Analog signal was gradually switched off in 2015 and it no longer exists.

Greenland
The analog signal was switched off on 9 January 2012.
Free-to-air digital terrestrial television using DVB-T is now covering all cities in Greenland, broadcasting TV and Radio stations from the Greenlandic and Danish broadcasting corporations.

Subscription based digital terrestrial television is currently available in the capital Nuuk, Qaqortoq, Ilulissat and Qasigiannguit through Nuuk TV.
In addition to channels from Greenlandic Broadcasting Corporation, Nuuk TV, and Danish Broadcasting Corporation, the service offers additional channels from C More, and from American and European cable networks (typically subtitled in Danish).

United States

The United States has adopted ATSC standards for digital terrestrial broadcasts. These standards include standard definition, enhanced definition, and high definition formats. On May 8, 2008, the Federal Communications Commission Chairman Kevin J. Martin announced that the agency would test run the transition to digital television in Wilmington, North Carolina beginning September 8, 2008. This was in order to work out any kinks which may not be foreseen before most of the country's broadcasters stopped transmitting traditional analog signals and upgrade to digital-only programming. Full-power terrestrial broadcasts using the analog NTSC standard was required by law to cease by June 12, 2009. Some television sets will continue to use analog NTSC tuners if connected to an analog cable system, or a converter box (which may receive digital signals over the air, from a cable system, or from a satellite system). Low-power stations continue to broadcast in analog, but these must transition to digital by September 1, 2015, or go silent.  Some Canadian or Mexican border signals may remain available in analog form to some US viewers after the shutdown of US-based full-power NTSC broadcasts.

Central America

Costa Rica 
Costa Rica chose Japanese - Brazilian standard ISDB-T as 7th country on 25 May 2010,
and started trial transmissions by Channel 13 from Irazú Volcano on 19 March 2012.

El Salvador
In the year 2017, the Government of El Salvador adopted the Japanese ISDB-T Platform.

Guatemala
Guatemala approved the use of Digital Broadcasting with the system ISDB-Tb

Honduras
Honduras was the first country in Central America to adopt a Digital TV standard, ATSC in 2007. Currently there are three digital channels broadcasting: "TEN Canal 10" was the first digital TV station in Honduras. It began broadcasting in 2007 in SDTV . CampusTv, is the first high definition TV station in Central America, CampusTv  was founded by the University of San Pedro Sula La U Privada. The third channel is "La UTV" founded by the National Autonomous University of Honduras.

Panama
Panama approved the adoption of the European standard DVB-T to be used for the first time on the 2010 World Cup.

South America

Argentina
After a bumpy ride of back and forths, Argentina officially selected the Japanese-Brazilian standard ISDB-T International on August 28, 2009, and agreed with Japan to cooperate for resource exchange and technical transfer.

While HDTV-ready TV sales are increasing in Argentina, no single HD feed is currently available by terrestrial television as of mid-2009, as the standard selection process wasn't officialized until August 28, 2009. As of this date only a few are available by cable, which are unregulated and use ATSC set top boxes installed at the customers' premises. Subscription TV provider Antina  uses the DVB standard to deliver an alternative service to cable TV, using standard definition analog outputs.

It is expected that the public TV stations begin transition to ISDB-T that the standard for Over-the-air transmissions has been set, and On air service started from 28 April 2010.

As of September 2011, a few programs are available in 1080i@50 Hz and broadcast by air. That includes most of local football matches and a TV show hosted by Sergio Goycochea (former goalkeeper of Argentina's national football team), all of them on "TV Pública HD"; and also soap operas such as "El Hombre de Tu Vida", "Cuando Me Sonreís" and "Supertorpe", on Telefe HD.

Bolivia
Bolivia chose Japanese - Brazilian standard ISDB-T International on 5 July 2010.

Brazil

The SBTVD standard (based on the Japanese standard ISDB-T) was adopted 29 June 2006 and launched on 2 November 2007. In 2007, only the greater São Paulo metropolitan area could receive the signal. Belo Horizonte and Rio de Janeiro began to receive free-to-air digital signal on April 7 and April 8, 2008, respectively. On August 4, 2008, and October 22, 2008, Goiânia and Curitiba began to receive DTV signal, respectively. Digital broadcast started at Salvador on December 2 and Campinas on December 3, 2008. The government estimated 7 years for complete signal expansion over all of the territory. Analog television is scheduled to be shut down on October 25, 2017.

The interactive platform called Ginga consists entirely of free software and received high publicity for being considered the main appeal for the change. The government promised WiMAX as return channel for the system, set to be implemented in the following years.

All 5 major TV networks (Band, Rede Globo, Rede Record, RedeTV! and SBT) broadcast in HDTV signal (1080i), SDTV 480i and 1seg as well.

Chile
TVN has made HDTV tests in 1999, Canal 13 is now broadcasting, in Santiago only, a test transmission in the three HDTV formats (ATSC, DVB and ISDB). In Valparaíso, UCV made ATSC broadcast tests for the Valparaiso area, and Canal 13 also has made tests in DVB format in April 2007 for the Valparaiso area. After rescheduling the date for a final decision on DTV formats several times, The government has stopped offering dates for such an announcement. On September 14, 2009, president Michelle Bachelet announced that the government had finally decided, after prolonged delays, on a digital television standard. Chile will be adopting the ISDB-T Japanese standard (with the custom modifications made by Brazil). Simulcasting is expected to begin in 2010, with a projected analog switch-off in 2017.

On September 10, 2010, TVN, Canal 13, Chilevisión, La Red, UCV, El Mostrador TV and NGB are transmitting digital signals in Santiago. TVN and Chilevisión tested 3D TV on free ISDB-T channels 30 and 33.

Currently there are 13 digital channels in Santiago:

24.1 Canal 13 HD
24.2 Canal 13 C
26.1 El Mostrador HD
26.2 El Mostrador SD
27.1 Mega HD
28.1 La Red Digital
30.1 Chilevision HD 1
30.2 Chilevision HD 2
33.1 TVN HD 1
33.2 TVN SD
36.1 Chilevision 2 (encrypted)
36.2 Canal de Noticias (encrypted)
36.3 Canal internacional (encrypted)

Colombia
On August 28, 2008 Colombia adopted the European digital terrestrial television standard, DVB-T. but on the 9th January 2012 changed this to DVB-T2. All transmissions now use DVB-T2 (6 MHz).

Señal Colombia —Colombia's state-owned channel— has made digital terrestrial television broadcast tests since 2006, in northwest Bogotá and downtown Cartagena, transmitting into the three DTV formats ATSC, DVB-T and ISDB-T. Also, the Chinese standard DMB-T/H, was considered, but could not be tested.

HDTV-ready television sets (DVB-T) have been available in Colombia since 2003, but cable companies have not broadcast HD content to their subscribers. Satellite television DirecTV Colombia offer HD channels.

Preparations were made to launch DVB-T services in (tentatively) May 2009, when the first DTV transmitter was to go live (probably at Manjui hill in Facatativá). The launch was to initially allow 11 million households in the regions of Bogotá D.C., Boyaca, Cundinamarca, north of Huila, Tolima, western Meta, and probably Caldas and Risaralda to watch DTV services.

On December 28, 2010, Caracol TV and RCN TV officially started digital broadcasts for Bogotá, Medellín and surrounding areas on channels 14 and 15 UHF, respectively. Señal Colombia and Canal Institucional had started test digital broadcasts earlier in 2010.

The Spanish Impulsa TDT, the association for the implementation of digital-terrestrial television and the Colombian government have signed an official agreement under which Spain will help the country implement DVB-T.

Ecuador 
Ecuador chose Japanese - Brazilian standard ISDB-T as 6th country on 26 March 2010.

Paraguay 
Paraguay chose Japanese - Brazilian standard ISDB-T on 1 June 2010.

Peru 
Chosen the Brazilian modified version of the Japanese standard ISDB-T on 23 April 2009. Agreed with Japan to cooperate for resource exchange and technical transfer on 21 August 2009, and On air service started on Channel 7 of TV Perú from 30 March 2010. 1seg is one of attractive system.

Achieved first HD live demonstration and test program transmission using OB Van in aiming nationwide deployment with the Japanese cooperation in Trujillo for 3 days from 28 January 2011.

Uruguay

On August 27, 2007, the Uruguayan government issued a decree stating that the DVB-T and DVB-H standards will be adopted. While HDTV-ready TV sets are available at the country, a few factors seem to constrain the development of the new technology in the near term:
 Prices for LCD, Plasma and DLP-based TV sets can be two times more expensive in Uruguay than in the region, or four times more expensive than in the US, while wages are also lower than in the region. Some DLP-based displays can cost up to US$7000 in Uruguay as of 2006. There have been few examples, if any, of CRT-based HDTV sets.
 The cable industry has few incentives to provide other services beyond basic TV services: Internet-by-cable and cable telephony have been either strictly prohibited by law (Antel, the local telco company owned by the government and with a strong union, enjoys a monopoly on basic telephony services and land lines) or thwarted by high taxes on equipment that make a business case for newer technologies unfeasible. Digital Cable has started rolling out, with an initial 100% increase of monthly cost for the SD digital service. High prices for HDTV sets do not help. Some of the cable companies for the largest markets are also owned by the largest local TV content providers, which as of 2006 have not started broadcasting any HDTV content since there has not been an approval of which standard is to be used by the government.
 DirecTV might be in a better position to provide HDTV content, given that they have experience and content from the US and given that they serve the whole continent. But DirecTV's policy in Uruguay has been that of providing "leftover" equipment from Argentina to its customers in Uruguay (i.e., first-generation RCA receivers), which do not yet support HDTV content or Dolby AC-3 Sound.
 Uruguay hoped for neighboring countries reaching an agreement on an HDTV standard, but so far that does not seem to be the case. Brazil has adopted the ISDB system, while Argentina and Uruguay have historically used TV systems based on a European standard (PAL-N 625/50 Hz). Argentina seemed to be settling on the ATSC standard before 2009, and Uruguayan URSEC authorities have provided no information on which road they will go. On August 27, 2007, URSEC settled on DVB-T and DVB-H. The TV sets being sold in Uruguay seem to be closer to ATSC HDTV-based standards (60 Hz systems, with ATSC tuners in some cases). Most of the DVD-based content in the country is NTSC/60 Hz-based, while the TV standard in use is PAL/50 Hz-based. Most of the analog TV sets sold are PAL-N, PAL-M and NTSC capable, while most DVD players are multi-region. Authorities are not asking retailers to identify which standard the HDTV sets sold adhere to.

Uruguayan government decided to adopt ISDB-T for geopolitical reasons and to be consistent relations with Argentina and Brazil on December 27, 2010, Uruguayans will start receiving digital television signals by the end of 2012, and scheduling analog signals blackout will be in 2014–2015.

Venezuela 
On October 6, 2009, Venezuela has officially adopted ISDB-T with Brazilian modifications. Transition from analog to digital is expected to take place in the next 10 years. The seven stages of Set-top box manufacturing, testing and implement schedule is well proceeding and will start to deploy DTT from 2011.

See also
 Digital television transition

References

 Pro Tv, singurul post din Europa de Est care transmite în format HD

External links
 The Launching Country, DiBEG-Japan
 Worldwide overview of the digital terrestrial systems ATSC, DMB-T/H, DVB-T and ISDB-T
 Digital TV News – By Country/Region

HDTV 
 List of Network HDTV affiliates (as of May 1, 1999; way behind the times)
 MilwaukeeHDTV

By area

Latin America 
Free-to-air DTV in Latin America NexTV Latam, TV Telco Latam

By country

Brazil
 SBTVD Development in Brazil

Canada 
 CRTC Public Notice

Colombia 
 CNTV Official government site about digital terrestrial television in Colombia

Israel 
 GoDigital Israel - Digital Terrestrial News from Israel

Japan
 DiBEG - Digital Broadcasting Experts Group

Regulators and organisations 
 Government
 ARIB
 JCTEA
 NHK STRL

Domestic promotion 
 The Association for Promotion of Digital Broadcasting (Dpa)

Industrial 
 JEITA

Satellite 
 B-SAT
 SKY perfect JSAT

Conditional access 
 B-CAS(Japanese)

Broadcasters and DTV Channel operators 
 NHK
 NTV
 TBS
 Fuji TV
 TV Asahi
 TV Tokyo
 MX TV 
 SKY PerfecTV!
 WOWOW
 STAR CHANNEL

Mexico 
 Mexican FCC Plan for DTT
 Mexican HDTV

Uruguay 
 Regulatory agency of radio spectrum in Uruguay

Digital television lists
High-definition television